"All You Did Was Save My Life" is the first single from Our Lady Peace's seventh studio album Burn Burn. The single was released in Canada on May 25, 2009 and in the US on June 9, 2009.

Music video
The music video, directed by Scott Weintrob was shot in Ancaster, a community in Hamilton, Ontario, Canada and was released on May 24. Actress Shenae Grimes made an appearance in the video alongside fellow Canadian, model Ronnie Flynn.

Charts

Weekly charts

Year-end charts

References

External links

2009 singles
Our Lady Peace songs
Songs written by Raine Maida
2009 songs
Songs written by Zac Maloy